Oldmans Township is a township in Salem County, New Jersey, United States. As of the 2010 United States Census, the township's population was 1,773, reflecting a decline of 25 (−1.4%) from the 1,798 counted in the 2000 Census, which had in turn increased by 115 (+6.8%) from the 1,683 counted in the 1990 Census.

Oldmans Township was incorporated on February 7, 1881, from portions of Upper Penns Neck Township (now Carneys Point Township). The township's name is a corruption of "Alderman's".

It is a dry town, where alcohol cannot be sold legally, though alcohol is available at the winery in the township.

Geography

According to the United States Census Bureau, Oldmans township had a total area of 20.69 square miles (53.58 km2), including 19.51 square miles (50.53 km2) of land and 1.18 square miles (3.05 km2) of water (5.70%).

Pedricktown (with a 2010 Census population of 524) is an unincorporated community and census-designated place (CDP) located within Oldmans Township.

Unincorporated communities, localities and place names located partially or completely within the township include Auburn, Dolbows Landing, Jumbo, Magnolia, Oldmans Point, Parkertown and Perkintown.

The township borders Carneys Point Township and Pilesgrove Township in Salem County; and borders the Delaware River and Oldmans Creek, which serves as its border with Logan Township and Woolwich Township in Gloucester County.

Demographics

Census 2010

The Census Bureau's 2006–2010 American Community Survey showed that (in 2010 inflation-adjusted dollars) median household income was $66,016 (with a margin of error of +/− $7,844) and the median family income was $68,077 (+/− $6,044). Males had a median income of $55,565 (+/− $4,420) versus $32,283 (+/− $4,346) for females. The per capita income for the borough was $29,150 (+/− $2,268). About 3.3% of families and 5.2% of the population were below the poverty line, including 7.5% of those under age 18 and 5.8% of those age 65 or over.

Census 2000

As of the 2000 United States Census there were 1,798 people, 654 households, and 517 families residing in the township. The racial makeup of the township was 86.82% White, 9.62% African American, 0.28% Native American, 0.17% Asian, 2.00% from other races, and 1.11% from two or more races. Hispanic or Latino of any race were 4.17% of the population.

There were 654 households, out of which 32.6% had children under the age of 18 living with them, 63.9% were married couples living together, 10.9% had a female householder with no husband present, and 20.9% were non-families. 17.0% of all households were made up of individuals, and 5.7% had someone living alone who was 65 years of age or older.  The average household size was 2.74 and the average family size was 3.07.

In the township the population was spread out, with 24.6% under the age of 18, 7.3% from 18 to 24, 29.0% from 25 to 44, 27.1% from 45 to 64, and 11.8% who were 65 years of age or older.  The median age was 39 years. For every 100 females, there were 102.2 males.  For every 100 females age 18 and over, there were 102.8 males.

The median income for a household in the township was $57,589, and the median income for a family was $64,091. Males had a median income of $45,469 versus $31,705 for females. The per capita income for the township was $22,495.  About 6.1% of families and 8.1% of the population were below the poverty line, including 10.2% of those under age 18 and 13.3% of those age 65 or over.

Government

Local government 
Oldmans Township is governed under the Township form of New Jersey municipal government, one of 141 municipalities (of the 564) statewide that use this form, the second-most commonly used form of government in the state. The governing body is comprised of a three-member Township Committee, whose members are elected directly by the voters at-large in partisan elections to serve three-year terms of office on a staggered basis, with one seat coming up for election each year as part of the November general election in a three-year cycle. At an annual reorganization meeting, the council selects one of its members to serves as mayor and another as deputy mayor.

, members of the Oldmans Township Committee are Mayor Dean Sparks (R, term on committee ends December 31, 2023; term as mayor ends 2022), Deputy Mayor Anthony Musumeci Jr. (R, term on committee ends 2024; term, as deputy mayor end 2022) and George W. Bradford (R, 2022).

Federal, state and county representation 
Oldmans Township is located in the 2nd Congressional District and is part of New Jersey's 3rd state legislative district.

 

Salem County is governed by a five-member Board of County Commissioners who are elected at-large to serve three-year terms of office on a staggered basis, with either one or two seats coming up for election each year. At an annual reorganization meeting held in the beginning of January, the board selects a Director and a Deputy Director from among its members. , Salem County's Commissioners (with party, residence and term-end year listed in parentheses) are 
Director Benjamin H. Laury (R, Elmer, term as commissioner ends December 31, 2024; term as director ends 2022), 
Deputy Director Gordon J. "Mickey" Ostrum, Jr. (R, Pilesgrove Township, term as commissioner ends 2024; term as deputy director ends 2022),  
R. Scott Griscom (R, Mannington Township, 2022), 
Edward A. Ramsay (R, Pittsgrove Township, 2023) and
Lee R. Ware (D, Elsinboro Township, 2022). Constitutional officers elected on a countywide basis are 
County Clerk Dale A. Cross (R, 2024),
Sheriff Charles M. Miller (R, 2024) and 
Surrogate Nicki A. Burke (D, 2023).

Politics
As of March 23, 2011, there were a total of 1,251 registered voters in Oldmans Township, of which 321 (25.7% vs. 30.6% countywide) were registered as Democrats, 385 (30.8% vs. 21.0%) were registered as Republicans and 545 (43.6% vs. 48.4%) were registered as Unaffiliated. There were no voters registered to other parties. Among the township's 2010 Census population, 70.6% (vs. 64.6% in Salem County) were registered to vote, including 91.8% of those ages 18 and over (vs. 84.4% countywide).

In the 2012 presidential election, Republican Mitt Romney received 51.0% of the vote (477 cast), ahead of Democrat Barack Obama with 47.9% (448 votes), and other candidates with 1.2% (11 votes), among the 941 ballots cast by the township's 1,320 registered voters (5 ballots were spoiled), for a turnout of 71.3%. In the 2008 presidential election, Republican John McCain received 501 votes (51.6% vs. 46.6% countywide), ahead of Democrat Barack Obama with 440 votes (45.4% vs. 50.4%) and other candidates with 12 votes (1.2% vs. 1.6%), among the 970 ballots cast by the township's 1,263 registered voters, for a turnout of 76.8% (vs. 71.8% in Salem County). In the 2004 presidential election, Republican George W. Bush received 516 votes (56.1% vs. 52.5% countywide), ahead of Democrat John Kerry with 396 votes (43.0% vs. 45.9%) and other candidates with 6 votes (0.7% vs. 1.0%), among the 920 ballots cast by the township's 1,228 registered voters, for a turnout of 74.9% (vs. 71.0% in the whole county).

In the 2013 gubernatorial election, Republican Chris Christie received 69.0% of the vote (432 cast), ahead of Democrat Barbara Buono with 28.1% (176 votes), and other candidates with 2.9% (18 votes), among the 633 ballots cast by the township's 1,338 registered voters (7 ballots were spoiled), for a turnout of 47.3%. In the 2009 gubernatorial election, Republican Chris Christie received 337 votes (51.4% vs. 46.1% countywide), ahead of Democrat Jon Corzine with 226 votes (34.5% vs. 39.9%), Independent Chris Daggett with 77 votes (11.7% vs. 9.7%) and other candidates with 10 votes (1.5% vs. 2.0%), among the 656 ballots cast by the township's 1,246 registered voters, yielding a 52.6% turnout (vs. 47.3% in the county).

Education 

The Oldmans Township School District serves public school students in kindergarten through eighth grade at Oldmans Township School. As of the 2018–2019 school year, the district, comprised of one school, had an enrollment of 290 students and 22.5 classroom teachers (on an FTE basis), for a student–teacher ratio of 12.9:1.

A majority of public school students in ninth through twelfth grades from Oldmans Township (more than 70% in 2018) attend Penns Grove High School as part of a sending/receiving relationship with the Penns Grove-Carneys Point Regional School District, with the balance (the remaining 30%) attending Woodstown High School in the Woodstown-Pilesgrove Regional School District, which also serves students from Alloway Township and Upper Pittsgrove Township. Students from Oldmans Township living west of Interstate 295 are sent to Penns Grove, while those east of the highway are sent to Woodstown. As of the 2018–2019 school year, Penns Grove High School had an enrollment of 508 students and 50.0 classroom teachers (on an FTE basis), for a student–teacher ratio of 10.2:1, while Woodstown High School had an enrollment of 603 students and 48.6 classroom teachers (on an FTE basis), for a student–teacher ratio of 12.4:1.

In 2016, the district commissioned a study by the Southern Regional Institute and Educational Technology Training Center at Stockton University to consider sending all students in grades 9–12 to Woodstown High School. The study concluded that Woodstown has the capacity to handle all of the students from Oldmans Township, but noted that the withdrawal from Penns Grove would results in a small decrease in the number of white students in that district's high school. In 2018, the Oldmans Township district sought permission from the Commissioner of Education to send all students to Woodstown, which has been opposed by the Penns Grove district based on the financial impact caused by the loss of tuition.

Some students also attend Gloucester Catholic High School in Gloucester City.

Transportation

Roads and highways

U.S. Route 130 passes through the northwestern part of the municipality while Interstate 295 travels through the center of the township and includes exit 7.

The New Jersey Turnpike passes through southern Oldmans. Two of the turnpike's service areas, named for people who lived or worked in New Jersey, are located in the township. From south to north, these are the Clara Barton Service Area (named for Clara Barton): southbound, milepost 5.4, and the John Fenwick Service Area (named for John Fenwick; northbound, milepost 5.4).

Public transportation
NJ Transit provides bus service between Pennsville Township and Philadelphia on the 402 route.

The Spitfire Aerodrome  is a small municipal airport located in the township, and is the only one of its kind in Salem County.

Notable people

People who were born in, residents of, or otherwise closely associated with Oldmans Township include:

 Robert W. Camac (1940–2001), thoroughbred horse trainer
 Jim Leonard (1910–1993), American football running back who played in the NFL for the Philadelphia Eagles

References

External links

Oldmans Township web site
Oldmans Township School District

School Data for the Oldmans Township School, National Center for Education Statistics
Pedricktown Website
Woodstown High School
Penns Grove-Carneys Point Regional School District
Penns Grove High School
AirNav Info on Spitfire Aerodrome

 
1881 establishments in New Jersey
Populated places established in 1881
Township form of New Jersey government
Townships in Salem County, New Jersey
New Jersey populated places on the Delaware River